Line Vedel Hansen (born 4 March 1989) is a Danish professional golfer.

Amateur career
Vedel Hansen started playing golf at Haderslev Golfklub as a nine year old, as her parents had a house adjoining the golf course. She was girl club champion 2001, 2003 and 2004, and ladies club champion 2003, 2005 and 2006. She enjoyed a successful amateur career, including a runner-up position at the 2010 European Ladies Amateur Championship, the best performance by a Danish golfer in the European Championships until Emily Kristine Pedersen won the tournament in 2013.

Professional career
Vedel Hansen qualified for the 2011 Ladies European Tour (LET) by finishing 16th at Q-School in December 2010, and turned professional in January 2011. After three years on the LET, she finished ninth at the LPGA Final Qualifying Tournament in December 2013 to qualify for the 2014 LPGA Tour. In April 2014, she finished fourth at the Swinging Skirts LPGA Classic in San Francisco and followed up with fifth place at the Meijer LPGA Classic and the Portland Classic. 

In early 2015, after finishing 45th on the 2014 LPGA Money List and reaching 59th place on the Women's World Golf Rankings, the highest ranked Danish golfer to date, she took an indefinite break from tour, and forfeited her start at the 2015 Women's PGA Championship. By the end of the year she announced she would not be seeking a medical extension, and instead retire from pro golf due to spinal disc herniation, only 26 years old.

Professional wins

Ladies European Tour (1)

Team appearances
Amateur
European Ladies' Team Championship (representing Denmark): 2008, 2010
Espirito Santo Trophy (representing Denmark): 2010

References

External links

Danish female golfers
Ladies European Tour golfers
LPGA Tour golfers
1989 births
Living people